The Minister of Immigration may mean:

Minister for Immigration and Border Protection (Australia)
Minister of Immigration, Refugees and Citizenship (Canada)
Minister of Immigration (New Zealand)  
Minister for Migration and Asylum Policy (Sweden) 
Minister for Security and Immigration (was Minister of State for Immigration) (United Kingdom)